Setapp is a subscription-based service for macOS and iOS applications released by the Ukrainian software company MacPaw in 2017. It provides access to a growing collection of software from different developers for a fixed monthly fee. App categories cover productivity, lifestyle, web development, Mac maintenance, creativity, writing, education, and personal finance. There are over 190 apps in the Setapp subscription and 1 million users.

History

Setapp launched in beta in November 2016, and was officially released in January 2017. In June 2017, Setapp reported having 10,000 subscribers worldwide, mostly in the United States but with growing audiences in the United Kingdom, Germany, and France. By November of that year there were more than 200,000 trial users testing the service.

In November 2019, Setapp launched Setapp for Teams, a service adjusted for teams' and organizations' use.

Setapp launched an iOS version in August 2020.

Business model

Setapp introduced a subscription model for software usage akin to streaming services like Spotify and Netflix.  Instead of paying a single price for a standalone application, users can use all the apps in the collection for a single monthly fee.

The philosophy behind the initiative was to give users preselected, ready-to-use software that covers both generic and job-specific tasks. Applications on Setapp are automatically updated and contain no in-app purchases or advertisements.

The main part of the revenue generated by Setapp is divided between app developers based on app usage.

System requirements 

macOS version:
El Capitan 10.11 (minimum) (current version 3.1.1 requires minimum Sierra 10.12; El Capitan 10.11 requires downloading 1.18.9 from the Internet Archive)
Sierra 10.12 and later (recommended; required to install iOS apps)

iOS apps have individual minimum requirements

500 MB of free space for initial installation
Internet connection to install separate apps

Awards and recognition 

 Finalist at the 21st annual Interactive Innovation Awards in the New Economy category
 Awarded "Consumer Product of the Year" by Product Hunt at the 2017 Golden Kitty Awards
 Awarded "Best SaaS Product for Productivity" by SaaS Awards in 2019

See also

 Subscription business model

References

External links

Utilities for macOS
MacOS software
Software delivery methods
Software distribution